Colobothea viehmanni is a species of beetle in the family Cerambycidae. It was described by Monné and Martins in 1979. It is known to be from Brazil.

References

viehmanni
Beetles described in 1979